Tangy Loch Castle is a ruined fortified dwelling on an islet in Tangy Loch, Kintyre, Scotland. It is about 5 miles/8 km north of Campbeltown. It was formerly connected to land (about 150 metres away) by a causeway, which is now submerged. The MacEachan family held the castle in the 17th century.

Notes

Kintyre
Ruined castles in Argyll and Bute
Scheduled Ancient Monuments in Argyll and Bute